SFO is the airport identifier code for San Francisco International Airport.

SFO may also refer to:
 San Francisco Opera
 Santa Fe Opera, New Mexico, US
 Serious Fraud Office (United Kingdom)
 Serious Fraud Office (New Zealand)
 Single family office, managing a family's wealth
 Specialist Firearms Officer of UK police
 Station facility owner of a UK train operating company
 Subfornical organ, in the brain
 Stocks, Futures and Options Magazine, 2001-2012